Espen Olsen (born 13 March 1979) is a retired Norwegian footballer. He was appointed manager of Strømmen IF ahead of the 2015 season. Ahead of the 2019 season he went on to HamKam as director of sports. He played for Lørenskog, HamKam, Stabæk, Start, Sogndal and Strømmen. He also played two matches for Norway national football team, against Mexico and USA in January 2006.

Career statistics

References

External links
Player profile at hamkam.no
Player profile at sogndalfotball.no

1979 births
Living people
Footballers from Oslo
Norwegian footballers
Eliteserien players
Norwegian First Division players
Norway international footballers
Association football forwards
Strømmen IF players
Hamarkameratene players
Stabæk Fotball players
IK Start players
Sogndal Fotball players
Norwegian football managers
Strømmen IF managers
Hamarkameratene non-playing staff